Hitterdal Chapel is a parish church of the Church of Norway in Røros municipality in Trøndelag county, Norway. It is the church for the Hitterdalen parish which is part of the Gauldal prosti (deanery) in the Diocese of Nidaros. The brown, wooden church was built in a long church style in 1959 using plans drawn up by the architect John Egil Tverdahl. The church seats about 130 people. The church was consecrated in 1959.

See also
List of churches in Nidaros

References

Røros
Churches in Trøndelag
Long churches in Norway
Wooden churches in Norway
20th-century Church of Norway church buildings
Churches completed in 1959
1959 establishments in Norway